Unwanted Thoughts Syndrome is a live album by comedian Maria Bamford, her third album following 2007's How to Win! The title refers to a condition coined by Bamford, which she calls "a little known version of obsessive-compulsive disorder", which Bamford experiences.  The album was recorded at Upright Citizens Brigade Theater in Hollywood, California in August 2008.

Track listing
"Baby Jesus" – 3:33
"My Sister" – 2:19
"Learning" – 5:33
"Wizard of Art" – 1:25
"Getting Older" – 1:13
"Being a Good Person" – 1:28
"Mentor" – 1:43
"Vision Board" – 8:54
"Love Songs" – 4:02
"I Miss Working in an Office" – 8:07
"Free Clinic" – 9:29
"Road Show" – 2:58

Personnel
Maria Bamford – performer
Martin Bauza – production
John Brown Quintet – package design
Ray Codrington – package design
Damon Jones – director, editing, musician
Steve Rossiter – mastering
Ian Stearns – engineering
Jack Vaughn – production

References

Maria Bamford albums
2009 live albums
Comedy Central Records live albums
Stand-up comedy albums
Spoken word albums by American artists
Live spoken word albums
2000s comedy albums